"Ruff Ryders' Anthem" is a song by American rapper DMX, released on 	May 5, 1998, as the third single from his debut studio album It's Dark and Hell Is Hot (1998). In 2008, the song was ranked at number 79 on VH1's 100 Greatest Songs of Hip Hop. In the US, upon the song's initial release it had originally peaked at number 93 on the Billboard Hot 100 chart, before reaching a new peak of number 16 following DMX's death in April 2021.

Background and conception
"Ruff Ryders' Anthem" was produced by Kasseem Dean, at the time an up-and-coming musician better known as Swizz Beatz. Swizz Beatz had been introduced to DMX by his uncles Darrin and Joaquin Dean, who are co-founders of the Ruff Ryders. According to Swizz Beatz, DMX had initially rejected the production: "I made the 'Ruff Ryders Anthem' beat in Atlanta. It was me just bugging out, having my New York influence and having my Atlanta influence. That track was the perfect blend which was awkward and different at the time because nobody had ever heard anything like that. DMX didn't want to do it. He was like, 'Man, that sounds like some rock 'n' roll track, I need some hip-hop shit. I'm not doing that. It's not hood enough." Despite Swizz Beatz's best efforts, it wasn't until Darrin and Joaquin Dean convinced DMX to give the track a chance that he did so. 

The background vocals and beat follow the rhythm of a military cadence. This coincides with the hook's theme of being a cohesive unit. Swizz Beatz once recalled how the 'What!' ad-libs formulated, stating "The 'What!' ad-lib and all of that came about in the middle of us hyping him up. We left it in the track to add energy. Collectively, we came up with that vibe".

Music video
The official music video was directed by J. Jesses Smith, who had previously worked with DMX on the visuals for “Get at Me Dog”. The video features cameo appearances by rap group Onyx as well as DMX's Ruff Ryders label-mates The LOX, Eve, and Swizz Beatz. It has over 165 million views on YouTube as of 2021.

Charts

"Ruff Ryders' Anthem (Remix)"

"Ruff Ryders' Anthem (Remix)" is a song featuring vocals from American rappers and Ruff Ryders cohorts DMX, Jadakiss, Styles P, Drag-On and Eve. The song was released in 1999 as the third and final single from DJ Clue's solo debut album, The Professional (1998).

The remix charted on the US Billboard Hot R&B/Hip-Hop Songs chart and was later featured in Grand Theft Auto: Liberty City Stories in the ingame radio station The Liberty Jam. In 2020, the song was featured in the video game Call of Duty: Warzone.

Charts

Certifications

References

External links

1998 songs
1999 singles
DMX (rapper) songs
Hardcore hip hop songs
Song recordings produced by Swizz Beatz
Songs written by Swizz Beatz
Def Jam Recordings singles
Roc-A-Fella Records singles
Ruff Ryders Entertainment singles
Gangsta rap songs
Songs written by DMX (rapper)

pl:How's It Goin' Down